The Aka or Biaka (also Bayaka, Babenzele) are a nomadic Mbenga pygmy people. They live in south-western Central African Republic and in northern Republic of the Congo. They are related to the Baka people of Cameroon, Gabon, northern Congo, and southwestern Central African Republic.

Unlike the Mbuti pygmies of the eastern Congo (who speak only the language of the tribes with whom they are affiliated), the Aka speak their own language along with whichever of the approximately 15 Bantu peoples they are affiliated.
 
In 2003, the oral traditions of the Aka were proclaimed one of the Masterpieces of the Oral and Intangible Heritage of Humanity by UNESCO. They were featured in the July 1995 National Geographic article "Ndoki: the Last Place on Earth", and a 3-part TV series.

Society

A traditional hunter-gatherer society, the Aka have a varied diet that includes 63 plants, 28 species of game and 20 species of insect, in addition to nuts, fruit, honey, mushrooms and roots. Some Aka have recently taken up the practice of planting their own small seasonal crops, but agricultural produce is more commonly obtained by trading with neighboring villages, whom the Aka collectively term as Ngandu.

From the Ngandu, they obtain manioc, plantain, yams, taro, maize, cucumbers, squash, okra, papaya, mango, pineapple, palm oil, and rice in exchange for the bushmeat, honey, and other forest products the Aka collect. There are over 15 different village tribes with whom the approximately 30,000 Aka associate.

As a result of their hunter-gatherer lifestyle, which frequently exposes them to the blood of jungle fauna, they have among the highest rates of seropositivity for Ebola virus in the world.

Parenting

Fathers of the Aka tribe spend more time in close contact to their babies than in any other known society. Aka fathers have their infant within arms' reach 47% of the time and make physical contact with them five times as often per day as fathers in some other societies. The men also help the women, by feeding their children. It is believed that this is related to the strong bond between Aka husband and wife. Throughout the day, couples share hunting, food preparation, and social and leisure activities.

History
The lifestyle of the Aka has been shifted from their traditional customs by European colonialism. The slave trade of the 18th century caused the migration of several tribes into Aka lands. These tribes subsequently became affiliated with the Aka. By the end of the 19th century, the Aka were the major elephant hunters providing tusks for the ivory trade. Affiliated tribes acted as middlemen in these transactions.

From 1910 to 1940, the Aka lands were part of French Equatorial Africa, and nearby affiliated tribes were forced into rubber production by the colonialists. These laborers occasionally escaped into forests inhabited by the Aka, increasing the demand for bushmeat. To meet this demand, the Aka developed the more efficient method of net hunting to replace traditional spear hunting. This caused a change in the social structure of the Aka: net hunting was seen as less physically challenging than using spears to kill game, and so women were encouraged take part in hunting activities.

In the 1930s, the French pressed the Aka to move into roadside villages. However, like the Efé of the Ituri rainforest, most Aka disobeyed and retreated into the jungle, with few joining the new settlements (except for a few villages in Congo-Brazza).

Today, economic pressures have forced the Aka to further deviate from their traditional customs. Many Aka now work in the coffee plantations of neighbouring tribes during the dry season instead of hunting as they would have done, and others have found employment in the ivory and lumber trade.

Conservation efforts
The World Wildlife Fund of Washington, DC, has worked with the Aka since the 1980s to protect gorilla habitats, minimize logging of forest, and promote other conservation efforts while empowering the Aka and other indigenous peoples. (needs to be evaluated)

Music
Their complex polyphonic music has been studied by various ethnomusicologists. Simha Arom has made historical field recordings of some of their repertoire. Michelle Kisliuk has written a detailed performance ethnography. Mauro Campagnoli studied their musical instruments in depth, comparing them to neighbouring pygmy groups such as the Baka Pygmies.

Aka musicians appear on African Rhythms (György Ligeti, Steve Reich and Pierre-Laurent Aimard, 2003), Echoes of the Forest: Music of the Central African Pygmies (Ellipsis Arts, 1995), BOYOBI: Ritual Music of the Rainforest Pygmies (Louis Sarno, 2000), and Bayaka: The Extraordinary Music of the BaBenzele Pygmies (Louis Sarno, 1996).

Films
The 2013 film Song from the Forest tells the story of American Louis Sarno who lived among the Bayaka pygmies in the Central African rainforest for 25 years and travels with his son, 13-year-old Samedi, to New York City.

See also

Other Pygmy groups:
Efé
Baka
Twa peoples

Anthropologists studying the Aka:
Barry Hewlett
Michelle Kisliuk

Books
Seize the Dance! BaAka Musical Life and the Ethnography of Performance by Michelle Kisliuk (Oxford University Press, 2000).
Song from the Forest -- My Life Among the Ba-Benjellé Pygmies by Louis Sarno (Houghton Mifflin 1993).

References

External links
Article: "Are the men of the African Aka tribe the best fathers in the world?"
Fieldwork about Baka, Aka and other pygmy groups
African Pygmies with photos, music and ethnographic notes
 www.songfromtheforest.com (SONG FROM THE FOREST official website)
 Countries and Their Cultures: Aka

African Pygmies
Modern nomads
Ethnic groups in the Central African Republic
Ethnic groups in the Democratic Republic of the Congo